George Bolton may refer to:

George Washington Bolton (1841–1931), American politician
Sir George Bolton (banker) (1900–1982), British banker
George Bolton (trade unionist) (born 1934), former communist and leader of the Scottish Area of the National Union of Mineworkers
George Bolton (priest) (1905–1968), Anglican priest in Ireland
George Bolton, character in The Adventures of Smilin' Jack (serial)